Laurel Neme is an American consultant in environmental and wildlife policy and natural resource management. She is the author of the book Animal Investigators: How the World's First Wildlife Forensics Lab Is Solving Crimes and Saving Endangered Species. She has worked as a consultant for the United States Treasury Department, the World Bank, bilateral donors such as USAID, and non-governmental organizations including the Environmental Defense Fund, the Nature Conservancy, and the World Wildlife Fund.

Publications
Her book Animal Investigators describes the work of the Clark R. Bavin National Fish and Wildlife Forensic Laboratory in Ashland, Oregon, which investigates crimes against wildlife. It is described as "a CSI for wildlife," the first and only crime lab of its kind. She has appeared on numerous radio and television shows to talk about the emerging science of animal forensics and the $20 billion worldwide business of smuggling wildlife and  wild animal parts. Time magazine also interviewed her about the wildlife black market and the attempts to investigate and stop it.

Neme works as a writer/editor for Earth Negotiations Bulletin, a publication of the International Institute for Sustainable Development (IISD) Reporting Services, that covers major international environmental negotiations and meetings, such as the Convention on International Trade in Endangered Species (CITES). She has also published numerous documents, ranging from Annual Reports to Congress for the United States Treasury Department to government technical reports for USAID and other organizations such as Nature Conservancy, the Environmental Defense Fund, and Rainforest Action Network. She has been published in academic journals including the Journal of  Modern African Studies and more popular online venues such as her own blog and other independent sites, including the online conservation publication Mongabay.

Education
She holds a Ph.D. in international and public affairs from Princeton University and a master's degree in Public Policy and a B.A. in Political Science from the University of Michigan.

Radio
She is the host of the radio program The Wildlife in Burlington, Vermont.

References

American science writers
Living people
University of Michigan College of Literature, Science, and the Arts alumni
Year of birth missing (living people)
Princeton University alumni
Gerald R. Ford School of Public Policy alumni